John Furlong may refer to:

 John Furlong (American actor) (1933–2008), American actor
 John Furlong (cricketer) (born 1972), New Zealand cricketer
 John Furlong (sports administrator) (born 1950), CEO of Vancouver Organizing Committee for the 2010 Olympic and Paralympic Winter Games